The  is a mini MPV with sliding doors manufactured by Toyota. It was introduced in September 2003, based on the Vitz/Yaris subcompact car, and is available at all Toyota dealerships in Japan. The Sienta is sold in Japan, Hong Kong, Singapore, Indonesia, Taiwan, Laos, and Thailand. , it is positioned below the Voxy/Noah and above the Roomy in Toyota's MPV lineup in Japan. In Indonesia and Thailand, it serves as an upmarket alternative to the Avanza and fills the gap between Avanza and the larger Innova. 

The "Sienta" name is derived from the Spanish word "siete", which means "seven" (referring to its maximum passenger capacity) and English word "entertain".



First generation (XP80; 2003) 

The first generation Sienta was introduced on September 29, 2003 in Japan. The car can also be found in Hong Kong, Indonesia, and Singapore through parallel imports.

The Sienta received a facelift on May 16, 2006, 3 years after its first production. New colours were added, such as Apple Green, Gun-Metal Grey, and Metallic Blue. Another upgrade found on the facelifted models is double electric-powered sliding doors.

ABS and EBD are standard.

For the 2007 model year on Japanese models only, G-BOOK, a subscription telematics service, is offered as an option.

Toyota temporarily stopped selling the Sienta in the third quarter of 2010 for unknown reasons, despite it still selling quite well. Sales resumed unchanged (except for renamed trim levels and a new sports model, Sienta Dice (stylised as "DICE"), with a different design) in May 2011.

Gallery

Second generation (XP170; 2015) 

The second generation Sienta debuted on July 9, 2015. It ditched the box-like shape of its predecessor for an updated exterior design inspired by the shape of a trekking shoe.

The minivan offers three interior layouts: 7-seater, 6-seater, and 5-seater (for wheelchair users). Interior space has been increased in all areas compared to the previous generation model. There is also a hybrid variant, which returns  under the Japanese JC08 cycle test, making it eligible for eco-car subsidies and tax incentives. The non-hybrid Sienta returns  in FWD configuration. A “Stop & Start System” is offered as standard. The second generation Sienta is also the first to be sold in Hong Kong and is also available in Singapore.

Markets

Japan 
The Sienta is available in X, G, Hybrid X, and Hybrid G trim levels in Japan.

Indonesia 
The second generation Sienta was launched at the 24th Indonesia International Motor Show on April 7, 2016. Production of the Indonesian-spec Sienta at Toyota Motor Manufacturing Indonesia plant in Karawang, West Java began in late June 2016 and sales began on July 26, 2016. Initial trim levels were E, G, V, and Q (equipped with body kits). To meet the standard geological conditions in Indonesia, it is  higher than the Japanese market Sienta. The shift knob location also moved to the floor to accommodate the 6-speed manual transmission, as well as the grip handbrake. The air conditioning knob was also redesigned.

Some visual differences as compared to the units sold in Japan were that it does not feature the “Sienta” badging embossed on the tailgate handle, instead, the model badge name is on the tailgate itself, and an additional rear foglamp is featured center mounted on the rear bumper edge. It uses a 2NR-FE 1.5-litre Dual VVT-i engine. The Modellista body kits were also available as dealer-installed options, which is badged as "Limited".

The facelifted model dropped the E trim from the lineup, followed later by G trim.

On August 17, 2020, the Welcab model based on the V trim was introduced.

Malaysia 
The Malaysian-spec Sienta was launched on August 18, 2016, and is fully imported from Indonesia. Two trim levels are available, G and V. It was discontinued in late 2019.

Singapore 
The Sienta is available both from Borneo Motors (Toyota's authorised dealer in Singapore) and parallel import distributors since 2016. V and G variants are available from Borneo Motors, with similar specifications as with the Indonesian model, and are available with the 1.5L 2NR-FE Dual VVT-i engine; hybrid models are only available from parallel importers.

Taiwan 
The Sienta was introduced in Taiwan in October 2016 as the replacement of the Wish in the market. It is available with the 1.5-liter 2NR-FE engine and the 1.8-liter 2ZR-FAE engine with VSC, hill-start assists, and 2 airbags as standard features. It is manufactured in Guanyin, Taiwan, and it is produced and sold as a left-hand drive vehicle. The top-of-the-line adds dual beam LED headlamps, LED tail lamps, 6 airbags, a head-up unit, dual powered sliding rear doors, colour-screen trip meter, reversing camera, leather-wrapped steering wheel, and transmission knob, and a double layer of front windshield as the top of the standard features.

The crossover-styled variant of the Sienta, called Sienta Crossover, was announced in Taiwan on 7 December 2020. It is only available with the 1.8-litre 2ZR-FAE engine.

Thailand 
The Sienta is available in Thailand in two trim levels, 1.5 G and 1.5 V. The top-of-the-line V trim adds dual beam LED lamps, push start and stop button, smart entry, Optitron trip meter, and automatic front AC on top of the standard features.

Facelifts

2018 Japanese market facelift 
The facelifted second-generation Sienta went on sale in Japan on September 11, 2018. The five-seater variant of the Sienta, called "Funbase", was added. The grille was mildly revised, with dashed motifs along with side chrome trimmings.

2019 Southeast Asian market facelift 
The facelifted Southeast Asian market Sienta was launched in Thailand on August 6, 2019 and in Indonesia on September 2, 2019. Unlike the Japanese market facelift, the changes are only applied to the grille and some parts of the interior. Other changes include armrests for the driver and second-row passengers.

Third generation (XP210; 2022) 

The third-generation Sienta was launched in Japan on August 23, 2022. Built on the GA-B platform shared with the XP210 series Yaris, it is offered in X, G and Z grade levels. It was also launched in Singapore on October 6, 2022. Imported from Japan, it is only offered in Hybrid Elegance grade level.

Sales

References

External links 

  (Japan)
  (Indonesia)

Sienta
Cars introduced in 2003
2010s cars
2020s cars
Mini MPVs
Front-wheel-drive vehicles
All-wheel-drive vehicles
Hybrid minivans
Partial zero-emissions vehicles
Vehicles with CVT transmission